Paulo Pereira (born 21 March 1965) is a Portuguese handball coach of the Portuguese men's national team.

In 2016, the Portuguese Handball Federation appointed him as the new head coach of the Portugal national team, succeeding Rolando Freitas. His current contract extends until the summer of 2023.

He is best known for leading the Portugal national team to achieve their best results in history by ranking 6th in the 2020 European Men's Handball Championship, and competing for the first time at the 2021 Tokyo Olympics, where they ended 9th.

In recognition of his historical achievements, he won the title of “Coach of the Year” at Sports Gala organized by the National Sports Federation. He won as well the ‘’technical’’ award of the eighth edition of the Bento Pessoa National Awards, under the category of ‘’Entities of National Scope’’.

His distinctive ideas of using aggressive, all-in tactics have completely changed the course of the Portugal national team. He is also a psychology aficionado who relies on advanced motivational techniques to optimize the players' efficiency.

Career
Paulo Pereira is a highly successful international handball coach with a career spanning over two decades and six countries:

Portugal: He started his coaching career at a young age, leading the children's team of CD Portugal. In 1996, he became the head coach of the CPN club (A popular club in the vicinity of Porto) and later moved to FC Porto in 1999 as an assistant coach. He was promoted to head coach of FC Porto in the 2002/03 season, replacing Branislav Pokrajac. When he led FC Porto, the team won the championship in 2001/02, 2002/03, and 2003/04, the cup in 2005/06, the Super Cup in 2000/01, and the League Cup in 2003/04 and 2004/05.

Spain: In 2006, Pereira moved to the Spanish second-division club C.B. Cangas, with whom he finished sixth and eighth in Honor Plata.

Angola: In 2009, he became Angola's national head coach, leading the team to victory in the 2010 Women's Handball Africa Championship. He also coached the Atlético Sport Aviação (ASA) women's team in 2008 and CD Primeiro de Agosto from 2010 to 2013, leading them to win the Angola Women's Handball League Cup in 2011.

Tunisia: In 2013, Pereira took over the Tunisian women's national handball team, winning the 2014 Women's Handball Africa Championship (their first champion win in this tournament since 1976). In 2015, he coached the Tunisian club Espérance Sportive de Tunis.

Back to Portugal: In 2016, the Portuguese Handball Federation named him the new head coach for the Portugal national team, then extended his contract until the summer of 2023.

He is best known for leading his national team to their best place in history, reaching the sixth place at the EHF EURO 2020 tournament. A monumental achievement for a team that had not been qualified for the competition for 14 years and over seven times of qualification. He led the team to compete for the first time in the men's Olympic handball tournament at the 2020 Summer Olympics in Tokyo, finishing in ninth place. In 2021, he successfully qualified the team for the World Championship after 17 years of absence (2003) and led them to an all-time best tenth place.

Romania: From 2017 to 2019, he was the parallel coach of the Romanian club CSM Bucharest, winning the 2018/19 EHF Challenge Cup.

Kuwait: In June 2022, he took over the Kuwaiti club Al Kuwait SC, winning the Asian Champions League in the same month.

Major achievements for the Portuguese men's national team
 Qualified for the world championship of 2023 (Sweden/Poland).
 Qualified for Euro 2022 (Hungary and Slovakia).
 Qualified for the Olympic Games of Tokyo, the first time in the history of a collective sport in Portugal (March 2021, Montpellier).
 Best classification ever in the world of male seniors (10° classified — Egypt 2021).
 Qualified for the world championship of 2021 (Egypt) after 17 years of absence.
 Qualified for the Paris Olympic qualification tournament (April 2020 postponed to March 2021).
 Best classification ever in a European (2020) senior male (6th classified) (Norway, Sweden, Austria).
 Qualified for the euro 2020 male seniors after 14 years of absence.

Honors

International competitions (6 titles)
Asian Club League Handball Championship :(1)
  Champions (Kuwait SC):  2022
Men's EHF European Cup :(1)
  Champions CSM București (men's handball):  2018–19
African Handball Cup Winners' Cup :(1)
  Champions Espérance Sportive de Tunis (handball):  2015
African Women's Handball Championship :(2)
  Champions :  2014
  Champions :  2010
IHF World Women's Handball Championship :(1)
  President’s Cup Winner :  2013

National competitions (11 titles)

2021 – 2022            Kuwaiti Handball League – Al Kuwait SC (Men’s)

2011 – 2012             Angola woman’s Super Cup Winner – Clube Desportivo 1º de Agosto

2010 – 2011             Angola woman’s Championship Winner – Clube Desportivo 1º de Agosto

2005 – 2006           Portuguese Cup Winner – FC Porto (Men’s)

2004 – 2005           Portuguese League Cup Winner – FC Porto (Men’s)

2003 – 2004       Portuguese Championship Winner & Portuguese League Cup Winner – FC Porto (Men’s)

2002 – 2003       Portuguese Championship Winner & Portuguese Super Cup Winner – FC Porto (Men’s)

2001 – 2002           Portuguese Championship Winner – FC Porto (Men’s)

2000 – 2001           Portuguese Super Cup Winner – FC Porto (Men’s)

Individual
Portuguese "Coach of the Year": (allocated by the Portuguese Sports Confederation)
Bento Pessoa National Awards (The technical Award)

References

1965 births
Living people
Portuguese people
Portuguese handball coaches
Handball coaches of international teams